Randy Onuoha (born 1 April 1994) is a Dutch footballer who plays as a left-back for VVOG.

References

External links

1994 births
Living people
Dutch footballers
Neftochimic Burgas players
PFC Slavia Sofia players
First Professional Football League (Bulgaria) players
Expatriate footballers in Bulgaria
Association football defenders
Footballers from Lelystad
Ter Leede players
VVOG players
Dutch expatriate footballers
Dutch expatriate sportspeople in Bulgaria
SV Huizen players
Fortuna Sittard players
NEC Nijmegen players
Almere City FC players
Derde Divisie players
ODIN '59 players